Songdo Moonlight Festival Park station is a Line 1 subway station of the Incheon Subway in Yeonsu-gu, Incheon, South Korea. It opened on December 12, 2020 and became the terminal station at the same time. It is designed so that the section after the station can pass at a speed of 65 km/h when the route is extended later.

References

Metro stations in Incheon
Seoul Metropolitan Subway stations
Railway stations opened in 2020
Yeonsu District